Bore Church is a parish church of the Church of Norway in Klepp Municipality in Rogaland county, Norway. It is located in the village of Bore. It is the church for the Bore parish which is part of the Jæren prosti (deanery) in the Diocese of Stavanger. The white, wooden church was built in a long church style in 1891 using designs by the architect Hartvig Sverdrup Eckhoff. The church seats about 165 people.

History
The earliest existing historical records of the church date back to the year 1322, but the church was not new at that time. It was likely built towards the end of the 12th-century as there is a preserved baptismal font from that time that is still in existence. In 1640, the church was torn down and replaced with a timber-framed long church. After the new church was completed, the old church was torn down and its cemetery was closed.

Media gallery

See also
List of churches in Rogaland

References

Klepp
Churches in Rogaland
Wooden churches in Norway
19th-century Church of Norway church buildings
Churches completed in 1891
12th-century establishments in Norway